"Sorafune"/"Do! Do! Do!" is a double A-side single by the Japanese boy band Tokio, released on August 23, 2006. It is the thirty-sixth release for the group, and also has been their most commercial successful effort after their 1995 best-selling debut single "Love You Only".

"Sorafune" was composed by Japanese recording artist Miyuki Nakajima, who has also gained success as a songwriter for other interpreters such as Naoko Ken and Shizuka Kudo throughout her three decade spanning career. In July 2006, the song was premiered on the Japanese television drama My Boss My Hero starring the group's primary vocalist Tomoya Nagase. Likewise, "Do! Do! Do!" was featured on commercials for the Xbox 360 that the band appeared in.

Immediately upon its release, the double A-side CD single was greeted with favorable reaction. It debuted at number one on the Japanese Oricon singles chart, having sold over 120,000 copies in first week. The band's fifth chart-topper "Sorafune"/"Do!Do!Do!" achieved enduring commercial success, entering the Oricon for over a year with physical sales in excess of 484,000 copies and becoming their longest charting material to date.

The CD single was certified double platinum by Recording Industry Association of Japan for shipments of over 600,000 units.

"Sorafune" was simultaneously recorded by the composer, and appeared on her studio album Lullaby Singer released in November 2006. Nakajima's version was dubbed English-translated title "Ship in the Air". The song has also been covered by artists such as Shizuka Kudo and Hideaki Horii.

Track listing
"Sorafune"/"Do! Do! Do!" was released in four different versions:

CD normal edition

CD limited press edition

CD+DVD version A

CD+DVD version B

Charts

Chart positions

Year-end charts

Certifications

References

2006 singles
Oricon Weekly number-one singles
Japanese television drama theme songs
Tokio (band) songs
Shizuka Kudo songs
Songs written by Miyuki Nakajima